San Giuliano or San Giuliano Martire is a Renaissance-style Roman Catholic church in Rimini, Italy.

The church was built during 1553–1575 adjacent to a Benedictine order abbey. The present structure was built at the site of a 9th-century church dedicated to Santi Apostoli Pietro e Paolo. The Benedictines were suppressed in 1797 by Napoleonic forces.

The church held works by Giuseppe Pedretti and Francesco Mancini. The main altarpiece is a master work by Paolo Veronese depicting the Martyrdom of San Giuliano (1588). The church also houses the polyptych (1409) by Bittino da Faenza (1357–1427) depicting episodes of this saint's life. Relics of the saint were kept in the church.

References

16th-century Roman Catholic church buildings in Italy
Roman Catholic churches in Rimini
Roman Catholic churches completed in 1575